The women's freestyle 67 kilograms is a competition featured at the 2003 World Wrestling Championships, and was held at the Madison Square Garden in New York, United States from 12 to 14 September 2003.

Results
Legend
F — Won by fall

Preliminary round

Pool 1

Pool 2

Pool 3

Pool 4

Knockout round

References

Women's freestyle 67 kg